Nitrazolam is a triazolobenzodiazepine (TBZD) 
, which are benzodiazepine (BZD) derivatives, that has been sold online as a designer drug.

It is closely related to Clonazolam or Flunitrazolam, only differing by the removal of a Chlorine or Fluorine group respectively at the benzene ring.

A study in mice indicated that nitrazolam can be several times more potent than diazepam as an antagonist of electroshock-induced tonic-extensor convulsions but less potent than diazepam at preventing the righting reflex.

Nitrazolam has been used as an example compound to demonstrate the microscale synthesis of reference materials utilizing polymer‐supported reagents.

Legal Status

United Kingdom 
In the UK, nitrazolam has been classified as a Class C drug by the May 2017 amendment to The Misuse of Drugs Act 1971 along with several other designer benzodiazepine drugs.

See also 

 Adinazolam
 Alprazolam (licensed)
 Flubromazolam
 Nifoxipam
 Nitemazepam
 Pyrazolam
 Triazolam (licensed)

References 

Benzodiazepines
Designer drugs
GABAA receptor positive allosteric modulators
Triazolobenzodiazepines